Alliance is a political party in Portugal founded by former Prime Minister Pedro Santana Lopes, following his departure from the PSD.

Policy positions 
Transform the Assembly of the Republic into a bicameral legislature with a Senate
A balanced budget, tighter controls over public spending, and lower taxes
Introduce alternative and individualized pension schemes to compensate for the increasing aging population
Electoral reform

Pedro Santana Lopes has stated that the party identifies itself with the liberal Renew Europe group in the EU Parliament.

Election results

Assembly of the Republic

European Parliament

Regional Assemblies

References

External links 
Declaration of Principles 
Party statutes 

2018 establishments in Portugal
Conservative parties in Portugal
Organisations based in Lisbon
Political parties established in 2018
Political parties in Portugal